The Computational Science Graduate Fellowship (CSGF) program is a highly selective graduate fellowship program sponsored by the United States Department of Energy and administered by the Krell Institute. Started in 1990, it awards four-year fellowships for American graduate students pursuing graduate degrees in all areas of computational science.

The award pays full tuition and an annual stipend of $45,000.

Notable recipients
Kristen Grauman

See also
 Hertz Fellowship
 NDSEG Fellowship
 NSF Graduate Research Fellowship

References

 Krell Institute Department of Energy Computational Science Graduate Fellowship website

Fellowships